Coulouris is a surname. Notable people with the surname include:

Andrew Coulouris (born 1978), American politician
George Coulouris (1903–1989), English actor
George Coulouris (born 1937), English academic, son of George
Mary Louise Coulouris (1939–2011), American-British artist